Émile Clerc (born 5 June 1934) is a French rower. He competed at the 1956 Summer Olympics in Melbourne with the men's eight where they were eliminated in round one.

References

External links 
 
 

1934 births
Living people
French male rowers
Olympic rowers of France
Rowers at the 1956 Summer Olympics
People from Thonon-les-Bains
World Rowing Championships medalists for France
Rowers at the 1960 Summer Olympics
Rowers at the 1964 Summer Olympics
Sportspeople from Haute-Savoie
European Rowing Championships medalists
20th-century French people